Diarmaid Ferriter (born February 1972) is an Irish historian, broadcaster and university professor. He has written eleven books on the subject of Irish history, and co-authored another. Ferriter attended St. Benildus College in Kilmacud in Dublin and University College Dublin.

Career
Since 2008, Ferriter is Professor of Modern Irish History at University College Dublin. He was formerly a senior lecturer in history at St. Patrick's College, Drumcondra, Dublin City University, and he was Burns Scholar at Boston College from 2008 to 2009. From 2003 to 2009, Ferriter hosted What If, a Sunday morning radio programme on RTÉ 1. His 2007 biography of Éamon de Valera, Judging Dev, won in three categories of the 2008 Irish Book Awards.

Beyond academia, Ferriter has developed a public profile in media and politics: He worked on multiple television projects, presenting a three-part television series, The Limits of Liberty, and later co-writing the 2018 documentary Keepers of the Flame. In 2013, he publicly supported the political campaign Democracy Matters, which opposed proposals to abolish the Irish Senate. In 2014, he began writing as a weekly columnist for The Irish Times.

In March 2019, Ferriter was elected a member of the Royal Irish Academy.

Bibliography
A Nation of Extremes; the pioneers in twentieth-century Ireland.  Irish Academic Press.  
Mothers, Maidens and Myths: A History of the Irish Countrywomen's Association
Cuimhnigh Ar Luimneach: A history of Limerick County Council, 1898–1998.
Lovers of Liberty? Local government in twentieth-century Ireland
The Irish Famine (co-authored with Colm Tóibín).  Profile Books Ltd.  
The Transformation of Ireland: 1900–2000.  Profile Books Ltd.  
What If? Alternative Views of Twentieth-Century Ireland.  Gill & Macmillan.  
Judging Dev: A Reassessment of the Life and Legacy of Eamon de Valera. Royal Irish Academy Oct 2007.  
Occasions of Sin: Sex and Society in Modern Ireland, Profile Books Ltd, September 2009
Ambiguous Republic: Ireland in the 1970s.  Profile Books Ltd, November 2012.  .
A Nation and not a Rabble: The Irish Revolution 1913-23. Profile Books Ltd, March 2015. 
On the Edge: Ireland's Offshore Islands: A Modern History. Profile Books, Ltd, September 2018 
The Border: The Legacy of a Century of Anglo-Irish Politics. Profile Books, Ltd, February 2019 
Between Two Hells: The Irish Civil War. Profile Books, Ltd, September 2021

See also
 Meda Ryan

References

External links

Official Site - University College Dublin

1973 births
Living people
Academics of University College Dublin
21st-century Irish historians
Members of the Royal Irish Academy
Radio personalities from the Republic of Ireland